Agamee Prakashani is a Bangladeshi publishing house located in Dhaka. It was founded in 1986 by Osman Gani. As of 2015, it has more than 2000 publications in both Bengali and English.

Awards
Agamee Prakashani has won several awards, including:

Bangla Academy Award
Shaheed Munier Choudhury Memorial Award
National Book Centre Best Publishers Award
Bangladesh Publishers & Book-Sellers Association Award

Gallery

References

External links

Bangladeshi brands
Book publishing companies of Bangladesh
Recipients of Bangla Academy Award
Bangladeshi companies established in 1986
Publishing companies established in 1986